Henry Croft (1856–1917) was a Canadian mining magnate.

Henry Croft may also refer to:

Henry Croft (pearly) (1861–1930), founder of the working class tradition of Pearly Kings and Queens
Henry Page Croft, 1st Baron Croft (1881–1947), British soldier and politician
Henry Holmes Croft (1820–1883), British scientist and educator
Harry Croft (1875–1933), baseball player

See also
Henry Crofts (1590–1667), English politician